František Antonín  (also Micza or Mitscha) (2 September 1696, Náměšť nad Oslavou – 15 February 1744, Jaroměřice nad Rokytnou) was a Czech conductor, Tenor singer and composer.

Míča was born in Náměšť nad Oslavou. He conducted many opera performances for royal families. The most paramount example of his work is probably the opera O původu Jaroměřic (About the Origins of Jaroměřice), written in both Italian and Czech, in which he also sung the role of Gualtero. He died in Jaroměřice nad Rokytnou.

A symphony now believed to be by his nephew František Adam Míča was once attributed to him.

Selected works
 Belezza e Decoro (Libretto by Domenico Blinoni), 1729)
 Nel giorno natalizio (1732)
 Theatral Festl (1734)
 Sieben Himmels Planeten und die Vier Elemente (1734)
 Operosa terni Colossi Moles (1735)
 Krátké rozjímání (Short Meditation) (1728)
 Obviněná nevinnost (Accused Innocence) (1729)
 Oefteter Anstoss (1730)
 Abgesungene Betrachtungen (1737)
 L'origine di Jaromeritz in Moravia (1730)

References

External links
Short Biography

1696 births
1744 deaths
18th-century Bohemian musicians
18th-century Austrian musicians
18th-century Austrian male musicians
18th-century conductors (music)
Czech conductors (music)
Male conductors (music)
18th-century classical composers
Czech male classical composers
Czech Baroque composers
People from Náměšť nad Oslavou